Stugeta somalina is a butterfly in the family Lycaenidae. It was described by Henri Stempffer in 1946. It is found in Somalia and northern Kenya.

References

Butterflies described in 1946
Iolaini